Extensor retinaculum of foot may refer to

 Inferior extensor retinaculum of foot
 Superior extensor retinaculum of foot